Old Hotel may refer to:

Old Hotel (Sugar Grove, Illinois), formerly listed on the National Register of Historic Places in Kane County, Illinois
Old Hotel (Dumfries, Virginia), listed on the National Register of Historic Places in Prince William County, Virginia